Keerti Gaekwad Kelkar (born 21 January 1974) 
 is an Indian television actress and model. She is prominently known for playing the leading character of Simar Prem Bharadwaj in television series Sasural Simar Ka. She began her career in 2002 with her first television debut in Kammal. In 2004, she did a TV series called Aakrosh, where she met the love of her life Sharad Kelkar who is a famous Bollywood and Indian Television Celebrity and Ex-Physical Trainer. She did a quite a number of TV shows and in some of them, she was cast opposite to her husband.

Career
She debuted as Kammal in Kammal and went on to play "Kanan" in Kahiin To Hoga and "Niharika" in Sinndoor Tere Naam Ka on Zee TV. She participated with her husband Sharad Kelkar in the second season of dance reality show Nach Baliye 2. In 2011, she took a Break from television. In 2017, she entered the Popular series Sasural Simar Ka as Simar, replacing the former Protagonist Dipika Kakar who was previously playing Simar. About her Comeback to screen after six years, she added "I wanted to return to television with a good project. Over the years, family took precedence and I was happy with that. But then, Colors TV approached me for Simar's role in Sasural Simar Ka, and I was sold. I am nervous and excited at the same time to face the camera after so long. She continues "Television has changed so much over the past few years, there are many new concepts and formats. Even the viewers are open to Storylines and narratives that were unfathomable earlier." About Replacing Dipika Kakar and her entry in the show, she said "Though the character of Simar is already established, the challenge lies in adding some freshness to it. I wouldn't have taken it up if it wasn't so challenging. I've seen Dipika in Sasural Simar Ka, and she's been fabulous. The show will bring its focus back on the Mother-daughter relationship and I believe that I will portray the role perfectly since I am also a mother." The show ended in March 2018.

Personal life
Keerti married her co-star from Sinndoor Tere Naam Ka and Saat Phere: Saloni Ka Safar, Sharad Kelkar on 3 June 2005.

Film(s)

Kiah Films Production

Television

References

External links
 

Actresses in Hindi television
Indian television actresses
Living people
1974 births
Actresses from Mumbai
21st-century Indian actresses
Actors from Mumbai